Mitromorpha purpurata is a species of sea snail, a marine gastropod mollusk in the family Mitromorphidae.

Description
The length of the shell attains 5.1 mm.

Distribution
This marine species occurs off the Philippines.

References

 Chino, M. & Stahlschmidt, P., 2009. New turrid species of the Mitromorpha-complex (Gastropoda: Clathurellinae) from the Philippines and Japan. Visaya: 63–82

External links
 MNHN, Paris: Mitromorpha purpurata (paratype)
 

purpurata
Gastropods described in 2009